Karayılan  (literally "black snake") is a town in Hatay Province, Turkey.

Geography 
It is situated to the east of Turkish state highway  and Çukurova Motorway. The population was 10574  as of 2012.

History 
The name of the town refers to a 17th-century Turkmen family. In 1691 the Ottoman government tried to settle the nomads. The nomads struggled to continue their traditional lifestyle. Although the government punished them by exiling to Rakka Eyalet (now in Syria) they were able to return. But at the end of continuous struggles,  towards the end of the 18th century, three families gave up and agreed to settle where they were assigned to. In 1990, Karayılan was declared a seat of township.

Economy
Cereals and citrus are among the major crops. Many residents work in Isdemir (steel works)

References 

Populated places in Hatay Province
İskenderun District
Towns in Turkey